Carmelo Zammit (born 19 December 1949, Gudja, Malta) is a Maltese Roman Catholic prelate and the current Bishop of Gibraltar.

Life
Zammit was born in Gudja, Malta, in 1949 and was ordained a priest in 1974. He holds a bachelor's degree in philosophy, Italian and economics, a licentiate in theology from the University of Malta, and a licentiate in canon law from the Pontifical Lateran University, Rome. Before his appointment, he served in a number of pastoral roles in Gibraltar, including judicial vicar, episcopal delegate for Catholic education, school chaplain and parish priest. Upon returning to Malta in 1998, he became chancellor of the archdiocese and judge in the ecclesiastical tribunal. He also served as Canon of the Metropolitan Chapter, as President of the St. John's Co-Cathedral Foundation, and Judicial Vicar in the Archdiocese of Malta.

He was consecrated bishop on 8 September 2016 by Vincent Cardinal Nichols in St. Paul's Cathedral, Mdina. Archbishop Charles Scicluna of Malta and Bishop Ralph Heskett of Gibraltar acted as co-consecrators.

References

1949 births
21st-century Roman Catholic bishops of Gibraltar
University of Malta alumni
Living people
20th-century Maltese Roman Catholic priests
People from Gudja